Nincehelser, pronounced: Nin-see-hell-sir, is the surname of a family of Americans that are settled throughout the Midwest including the states of: Ohio, Nebraska, Kansas, Texas, Colorado, and Florida.

The name is thought to be of German origin.

References 
Nincehelser House

Surnames